Colongra Gas Generation Plant (also known as Colongra Power Station) is a 667 MW gas-fired power station located in Colongra, New South Wales, Australia and is the largest gas-fired power station in New South Wales. It will generally be used during peak demand periods in New South Wales.

The plant's construction was tendered to Alstom which began the construction in October 2007, adjacent to the Munmorah coal-fired power station.  The plant was completed and commissioned in December 2009 at a cost of A$500 million.

It was bought by Snowy Hydro in January 2015.

References

Natural gas-fired power stations in New South Wales